Zielenin  is a village in the administrative district of Gmina Kościerzyna, Kościerzyna County, Pomeranian Voivodeship, in northern Poland. The village has a population of 162.

See also
 History of Pomerania

References

Zielenin